This is a list of Estonian football transfers in the winter transfer window 2017–18 by club. Only transfers in Meistriliiga are included.

Meistriliiga

Flora

In: 

Out:

FCI Levadia

In: 

Out:

Kalju

In:

Out:

Trans

In: 

Out:

Paide Linnameeskond

In: 

Out:

Tammeka

In: 

Out:

Tulevik

In: 

Out:

Vaprus

In: 

Out:

Kalev

In: 

Out:

Kuressaare

In: 

Out:

See also
 2018 Meistriliiga

References

External links
 Official site of the Estonian Football Association
 Official site of the Meistriliiga

Estonian
transfers
transfers
2017–18